Air Service Comores was a small airline which served to transport people and cargo between the three islands of the Comoros, as well as the nearby island of Mayotte.

Fleet 

As of August 2006 the Air Service Comores fleet included:

2 Let L-410 UVP

Banned in the EU 
All but 1 L-410 are on the List of air carriers banned in the EU.

See Also 
 List of defunct airlines of the Comoros

References

External links
 List of banned airlines in Europe

Defunct airlines of the Comoros
Airlines established in 1996
Airlines disestablished in 2016